Weert dialect or Weert Limburgish (natively ,) is the city dialect and variant of Limburgish spoken in the Dutch city of Weert alongside Standard language. All of its speakers are bilingual with standard Dutch. There are two varieties of the dialect: rural and urban. Van der Looij gives the Dutch name  for the peripheral dialect.

Influence of Standard Dutch

The voiced velar stop  is used less often by younger speakers, who merge it with the voiced velar fricative . In Standard Dutch,  occurs only as an allophone of  before voiced stops, as in   'handkerchief' and (in the Netherlands alone) as a separate phoneme in loanwords such as   'goal' (in sports).

Phonology

Consonants

  are bilabial, whereas  are labiodental.
  is realized as a bilabial approximant  in the onset and as labio-velar  in the coda.
 In the syllable onset,  can occur only in proper names and loanwords. In that position, their status is marginal.
  and  occur only intervocalically.
 Word-initial  is restricted to loanwords.
 As in all areas with soft G,  are realized as post-palatal  (hereafter represented without the diacritics) when they are preceded or followed by a front vowel.
  is a voiced fricative trill, with the fricative component varying between uvular  and post-velar . The fricative component is particularly audible in the syllable coda, where a partial devoicing to  also occurs.

Vowels

According to Peter Ladefoged, the vowel inventory of the dialect of Weert may be the richest in the world. It features 28 vowels, among which there are 12 long monophthongs (three of which surface as centering diphthongs), 10 short monophthongs and 6 diphthongs. Such a large vowel inventory is a result of the loss of a contrastive pitch accent found in other Limburgish dialects, giving  and  a phonemic status. Those vowels correspond to the phonemically short  and  combined with Accent 2 in other dialects.

 The Weert dialect features five phonetic degrees of openness among unrounded front vowels: close, close-mid, mid, open-mid and open. Furthermore,  is clearly not front phonologically as it is subject to umlauting in diminutives and in other contexts, as in other Limburgish dialects. This suggests that it is phonologically central, as in Hamont as well as the vowel transcribed with the same symbol in German.
It is much like the distinction found in the Kensiu language. The close-mid  is transcribed as such (rather than with ) due to the fact that  is typically used for tense/free vowels in Dutch dialectology, whereas  is lax/checked, much like  in Standard Dutch.
 The phonetic value of the symbol  is far removed from its canonical IPA value, being a close-mid central vowel:  (transcribed as a mid-centralized  in the table above). The symbol  is used here because it is a phonological front vowel, as in other dialects of Limburgish.
 Older speakers may have an additional vowel , giving rise to a phonemic contrast between the short closed O  (spelled ) and the short open O  (spelled ). Other speakers have just three short back vowels , as in Standard Dutch.
 Some speakers are not secure in the distribution of  vs.  as well as  vs. . In the future, this may lead to a merger of the two pairs, leaving a short vowel system that is exactly the same as in Standard Dutch (phonetic details aside).
The varieties spoken in Nederweert and Ospel also use  in this context. The difference is systematic, though it does not occur throughout the entire vocabulary of words with those vowels.

Taking all of that into consideration, the vocalic phonemes of the Weert dialect can be classified much like those found in other Limburgish dialects.

In this table, vowels in the mid row correspond to the open-mid  in other dialects. The two vowels in the open-mid row correspond to the open  in other dialects, which means that the open-mid row can be merged with the open row, leaving just four phonemic heights. In this article, five heights are assumed, following the sources. In his paper on the best IPA transcription of Standard Dutch, Gussenhoven has criticized the analysis of the open-mid  as phonologically open on the basis of the vowel being phonetically too close to be analyzed as open like  (which is front in Standard Dutch, just like in Weert).

The vowel+glide sequences ,  and  pattern as the short counterparts of  - see below.

Phonetic realization
Elsewhere in the article, their diphthongal nature is ignored.
 Apart from the phonetically central , the phonemic front rounded vowels are phonetically front, including the onset of : .
In other dialects, they tend to be open-mid . The corresponding short vowels have the same quality: .
 The closing diphthongs  are similar in quality to their Standard Dutch counterparts.

Phonotactics
  occurs only in unstressed syllables.
  are phonological long monophthongs despite their obvious diphthongal nature. However, at least  sometimes violates that rule, as it occurs in the name of the town itself and derivatives.
  are rare before .
 Among the long open(-mid) vowels,  and  appear only before sonorants, making them checked vowels. They directly correspond to the short checked vowels  combined with Accent 2 in other dialects (in which  corresponds to Weert ).
 The closing diphthongs  are rare in the word-final position.

Differences in transcription
Sources differ in the way they transcribe the unrounded front vowels of the Weert dialect in words such as  'to say',  'leaf' (dim.),  'dishcloth' and  'tent'. The differences are listed below.

This means that the symbols  and  have the opposite values, depending on the system.

The closing diphthongs are given a phonetically explicit transcription  in this article to match the changes described above. This kind of transcription has been used by e.g.  for vowels found in a transitional Brabantian-Limburgish dialect of Orsmaal-Gussenhoven.

Vowel+glide sequences
The Weert dialect allows a massive amount of vowel+glide sequences.

The sequences ,  and  contrast with the phonemic diphthongs . The former begin with more open vowels than the phonemic diphthongs: . Thus, what in tonal dialects of Limburgish is the contrast between   'legs' (pronounced with Accent 1) and   'leg' (pronounced with Accent 2) is a length and vowel quality difference in Weert:  vs. . Other (near-)minimal pairs include   'German' (adj.) vs.   'fun' and   'eye' vs.   'also'. This kind of contrast between a vowel+glide sequence and a diphthong is extremely rare in the world's languages.

Suprasegmentals
The Weert dialect features an intonation system that is very similar to Standard Dutch. The stress pattern is the same as in the standard language. It does not feature a contrastive pitch accent, instead, the difference between Accent 1 and Accent 2 found in the more easterly dialects of Limburgish corresponds to a vowel length distinction in Weert; compare   'rabbits' and   'mountains' with   'rabbit' and   'mountain'. The phonological vowel+glide sequences  correspond to  combined with Accent 1 in other dialects, whereas the phonological diphthongs  (which are longer than the vowel+glide sequences) correspond to  combined with Accent 2 in other dialects.

According to Linda Heijmans, Weert dialect may have never been tonal at all, and the use of contrastive vowel length in minimal pairs such as – could have sprung from the desire to sound like speakers of tonal dialects spoken nearby Weert, such as the dialect of Baexem. This hypothesis has been rejected by Jo Verhoeven, who found that Weert speakers can still distinguish between the former tonal pairs on the basis of tone whenever vowel length is ambiguous. Thus, his findings support the theory that the former tone distinction was at some point reinterpreted as a vowel length distinction.

Sample
The sample text is a reading of the first sentence of The North Wind and the Sun.

Phonetic transcription

Orthographic version

References

Bibliography

 
 
 
 
 
 
 
 
 

Central Limburgish dialects
Culture of Limburg (Netherlands)
Languages of the Netherlands
Low Franconian languages
Weert
City colloquials